Bibhuti Bhushan Halt railway station is a small railway station in North 24 Parganas district, West Bengal. Its code is BNAA. It serves the surrounding areas of Bongaon town. The station consists of two platforms. The platform area is not well sheltered. It lacks many facilities including water and sanitation. The station is named after the famous Bengali writer Bibhutibhusan Bandopadhyay.

Bibhuti Bhushan Halt railway station is located on Sealdah–Hasnabad–Bangaon–Ranaghat line of Kolkata Suburban Railway. Link between Dum Dum to Khulna now in Bangladesh, via Bangaon was constructed by Bengal Central Railway Company in 1882–84. The Sealah–Dum Dum–Barasat–Ashok Nagar–Bangaon sector was electrified in 1963–64.

Layout

See also

References

External links 

 Bibhuti Bhushan Halt Station Map

Sealdah railway division
Railway stations in North 24 Parganas district
Kolkata Suburban Railway stations